Dil Mera Dharkan Teri may refer to:
 Dil Mera Dhadkan Teri, a 2013 Pakistani romantic drama
 Dil Mera Dharkan Teri (1968 film), a Pakistani Urdu-language musical romance film